Armand Robin (January 19, 1912 –  March 30, 1961) was a French poet, translator, and journalist.

Life 
Robin was born in Plouguernével by Rostrenen (Côtes-d'Armor) and his mother tongue was Breton. He learnt French when attending his first school years. He was unable to settle down for all his life. He traveled to the USSR in 1934, and returned shocked by the reality of communism. During the German occupation of France during World War II he worked in radio broadcasting foreign news.

Robin continued his language studies so that he understood twenty-six languages. He translated works from English (Shakespeare), Russian (Yesenin, Blok, Pasternak), Hungarian (Ady), Polish (Mickiewicz), Italian (Ungaretti), Chinese (Tu Fu), Flemish, Finnish, German, Arabic, Spanish, Kalmyk, etc.

He joined the French Anarchist Federation in 1945, which published his Poèmes indésirables (Undesirable Poems). He authored "La fausse parole" (The False Word), which dissected the mechanisms of propaganda in the totalitarian countries.

On March 27, 1961, Robin was arrested because he had no identity document, and died three days later under mysterious circumstances in a Parisian hospital.

Works

Own poetry with translations 
 Ma vie sans moi (1940); My life without me

Poetry 
 Poèmes indésirables (1945)
 Le Monde d'une voix, Éditions Gallimard (1968)
 Fragments, Gallimard (1992)
 Le cycle du pays natal, La Part Commune (2000)

Translations 
 Poèmes d'Ady, Le Seuil (1946), Le temps qu'il fait (1991)
 Poèmes de Boris Pasternak (1946)
 Quatre Poètes russes (1949)
 Poésie non traduite (1953)
 Poésie non traduite II (1958)
 Rubayat d'Omar Khayam (1958)
 Les Gaillardes Épouses de Windsor et Othello de Shakespeare (1958)
 Le Roi Lear de Shakespeare (1959)
 Écrits oubliés II, Ubacs (1986)

Novel 
 Le Temps qu'il fait (1942)

Radio broadcasts 
 Pâques fête de la joie, Calligrammes (1982)
 Poésie sans passeport, Ubacs (1990)

Essays, articles 
 La fausse Parole, Minuit (1953), Le Temps qu'il fait (2002)
 L'homme sans nouvelle, Le temps qu'il fait (1981)
 Écrits oubliés I, Ubacs (1986)
 Expertise de la fausse parole, Ubacs (1990)

Correspondence 
 Lettres à Jean Guéhenno, Lettres à Jules Supervielle, Librairie La Nerthe (2006)

References 

1912 births
1961 deaths
People from Côtes-d'Armor
Poètes maudits
French anarchists
20th-century French poets
French male poets
Russian–French translators
English–French translators
German–French translators
Translators from Persian
20th-century French male writers
20th-century translators

Murdered anarchists
Death conspiracy theories